Anbar may refer to:

Places and jurisdictions

Iraq 
 Anbar (town), near Iraqi capital Baghdad
 Al Anbar Governorate, a province of Iraq

Elsewhere 
 Anbar, Iran (disambiguation)
 Anbar, Swabi, Pakistan
 Anbar, Kocaköy

Other uses 
 Electricity, in His Dark Materials, by Philip Pullman; see His Dark Materials terminology

See also 
 Anwar (disambiguation)